IBC News 11 O'Clock Report was a former English language late-night newscast of Islands TV-13 from October 1, 1990, to March 6, 1992, and IBC-13 from March 9, 1992, to July 7, 1995, replacing Headline Trese and was replaced by CTN Midnite.

Anchors
TG Kintanar (1990–1994)
Katherine De Leon-Villar (1990–1992)
Cory Quirino (1992–1994)
Timmy Cruz (1994–1995)

See also
List of programs previously broadcast by Intercontinental Broadcasting Corporation
IBC News and Public Affairs

Philippine television news shows
1990s Philippine television series
1990 Philippine television series debuts
1995 Philippine television series endings
English-language television shows
IBC News and Public Affairs
Intercontinental Broadcasting Corporation original programming
Intercontinental Broadcasting Corporation news shows